A Pollinaire Rave is a comedy tour by of Montreal lead singer Kevin Barnes, his wife, Nina Barnes, and his brother David Barnes. Both the titles and the artwork vary depending on the individual copy. A CD by the same name was sold, and five of the seven songs on the EP became songs on the Montreal album Satanic Panic in the Attic.

Partial track listing
The track listing below reflects the titles given by Kevin Barnes at the time, followed by the names the songs eventually took on.

Original titles
 The Fading and Frozen Phallus in the Eye of a Young Brute
 Whatever Happened to the Breath of Tom the Sandwidth
 Nightmare Onanism
 Gladiator Chestsex and the Collision
 Shut the Orb Lady
 Wednesday's Foam on Tuesday Again?
 Yes, The Bird May Remember Being Hoofed

Finished titles
 How Lester Lost His Wife (demo)
 Chrissy Kiss the Corpse (demo)
 City Bird (demo)
 Erroneous Escape Into Eric Eckles (demo)
 Everything About Her is Wrong
 Epistle to a Pathological Creep
 Eros' Entropic Tundra (demo)

Comedy albums by American artists
2005 live albums
2000s comedy albums